De Nooijer is a Dutch surname. Notable people with the surname include:

Bradley de Nooijer (born 1997), Dutch footballer
Dennis de Nooijer (born 1969), Dutch footballer
Gérard de Nooijer (born 1969), Dutch footballer
Jeremy de Nooijer (born 1992), Dutch-born Curaçaoan footballer
Teun de Nooijer (born 1976), Dutch field hockey player

Dutch-language surnames